NRP Adamastor was a small unprotected cruiser of the Portuguese Navy that was launched in 1896 and remained active until being decommissioned in 1933, being the only ship of its class. The vessel played an important role in the 5 October 1910 revolution in the Kingdom of Portugal, which saw the fall of the monarchy, and later took part in actions in Portuguese Africa during World War I.

Technical details

General characteristics
The cruiser was built in Livorno, Italy. The technical details of the ship were discussed in an 1898 issue of the supplement for the Scientific American magazine. The hull of Adamastor was made of steel and the lower decks had watertight compartments. Two electrical ventilators were provided to ventilate the ship in hot climates. The ship had a total crew of 237 officers and ratings. The quarter deck included the captain's chambers while the officer accommodations were located aft below the main deck. The top forecastle was occupied by the quarters of the petty officers and sailors.

Armament
Adamastors armament included two 150 mm and four 105 mm Krupp naval guns on the main deck, along with two 47 mm Hotchkiss guns on the bridge, and Nordenfelt machine guns. The ship also possessed three torpedo tubes.

Propulsion
Around 400 tons of coal were kept aboard Adamastor.

Operational history
The ship had originally been built with money from public subscription in order to restore Portugal's honor after being humiliated by Great Britain in 1890, being prevented from making a land route from its two colonies of Angola and Mozambique. It was laid down in January 1895 and launched in July 1896, before being completed in August 1897.

In 1897 the ship was deployed to the Moroccan coast, along the with ironclad Vasco da Gama and Spanish ships, to hunt pirates. Around 1908 she visited Portuguese Timor and stopped in the Dutch East Indies.

When the 5 October 1910 revolution broke out in Lisbon, the Portuguese Navy would play an important role, in particular the crew of the Adamastor who rose up simultaneously as a revolt begin in the capital. Among the supporters of the revolution were the crew of three cruisers, including Adamastor, which helped to bomb the Necessidades Palace of the King of Portugal along with the cruiser São Rafael. Thus the cruiser would become a symbol of the revolution.

During World War I, Portugal took part in fighting against Paul von Lettow-Vorbeck's troops during the campaign in eastern Africa. In 1917, German forces entered Portuguese Mozambique. Although they defeated the Portuguese and British land forces, Adamastor and another cruiser were sent to the important port of Quelimane, at which point the Germans decided not to attack the city.

Adamastor ran aground in October 1929, but was refloated and returned to service before being decommissioned in 1933.

Notes

Books

External links 
 

Naval ships of Portugal
Cruisers of Portugal
1896 ships
Ships built in Livorno
Maritime incidents in 1929